Luciano Cilio (1950 – 21 May 1983) was an Italian composer and musician.

Born in Naples, Cilio recorded and released an album of minimalist music, in 1977. An expanded version of the album, entitled Dell'Universo Assente was released in 2004. One of his pieces, "Della Conoscenza", is featured on No. 18 of The Wire magazine's long-running series of CD compilations The Wire Tapper.

He died in Milan by his own hand at the age of 33.

References

External links
Luciano Cilio: Dell'Universo Assente, review
Luciano Cilio Dell'Universo Assente official reissue at Die Schachtel

1950 births
1983 deaths
20th-century classical composers
Contemporary classical music performers
Italian classical composers
Italian male classical composers
Minimalist composers
Musicians from Naples
Suicides in Milan
20th-century Italian composers
20th-century Italian male musicians
1983 suicides